Silver Rain is a 2015 Nigerian-Ghanaian political drama film. It was written and directed by Juliet Asante.

Cast 
Belinda Baidoo	as Tima
Michael Bassey	as Prince
Kofi Bucknor as Mr. Timothy
Joselyn Dumas as Ajoa
Uru Eke as Loreal
Offie Kudjo as Mrs. Timothy
Elikem Kumordzie as Paul
Annabel Mbaru as Esi
Enyinna Nwigwe as Bruce
Chumani Pan as Mark

Plot 
The story follows a girl Ajoa who comes from an impoverished family and falls in love with Bruce. Their relationship must thrive amidst social differences.

Reviews 
360nobs concluded that "Despite its gaping holes, Silver Rain is entertaining."

Xplorenollywood says it is "a brilliant production with a Pan African cast that did justice to their roles" and rates it 5.5/10.

Accolades 
It was nominated on AMVCA 2016 for Best Movie Overall (Africa), Best Movie – West Africa (Drama/Comedy) and Best Costume Designer (Movie/TV Series).

References

External links 

2010s English-language films
English-language Ghanaian films
English-language Nigerian films